Scopula umbilicata, the swag-lined wave moth, is a moth of the family Geometridae. The species was first described by Johan Christian Fabricius in 1794. It is found from the southern part of the United States (including Arizona, Florida, Georgia, Oklahoma and Texas) to South America and the West Indies (including Puerto Rico).

The wingspan is about 18 mm. The wings are white with sparse speckling.

References

Moths described in 1794
umbilicata
Moths of North America
Moths of South America